The 1968 Tangerine Bowl was held on December 27, 1968, at the Tangerine Bowl stadium in Orlando, Florida. The Richmond Spiders of the Southern Conference defeated the Ohio Bobcats of the Mid-American Conference by a score of 49–42. The Tangerine Bowl is a former name of what is now called the Citrus Bowl.

Heading into the game, Ohio University finished their regular season slate with a perfect 10–0–0 record. The Bobcats also held a #15 Associated Press (AP) national ranking. The 1970 Ohio Bobcats football team had one of the most potent offenses the nation and was spearheaded by quarterback Cleve Bryant. Ohio was one of only three NCAA programs to finish their regular season with an unbeaten and untied record.

The University of Richmond entered with an 8–3–0 record. They were Southern Conference champions after having finished 6–0–0 in conference play. They were decided underdogs against Ohio and the national media did not give them much of a chance to compete, let alone win the game. The upset-minded Spiders did just that, however, winning their first-ever postseason bowl game 49–42. It would ultimately be Richmond's only bowl victory (they lost in their only other bowl appearance, the 1971 Tangerine Bowl).

After the loss, the Bobcats finished #20 in the final AP Poll.

Post-game quotes
"It is the biggest thing I have ever been associated with. I know it is the biggest athletic victory for the University of Richmond." –Frank Jones, Richmond head coach
"I've played football a long time, but this is the greatest. It's been something we've been working for since spring practice." –Buster O'Brien, Richmond quarterback

References

Tangerine Bowl
Citrus Bowl (game)
Ohio Bobcats football bowl games
Richmond Spiders football bowl games
Tangerine Bowl
Tangerine Bowl